Pegasus News was an online-only hyperlocal news source for the Dallas–Fort Worth region founded by Mike Orren.

The site was originally owned by PanLocal Media LLC. It pioneered many news site features that have since become more common, including customized content per-user, programmatic advertising, content curation from partner sites and tight integration of advertising and editorial in a single content management system.

In 2007 the website was acquired by Fisher Communications, who said that they planned to use the Pegasus model for their television stations' websites.

Pegasus News won a Katie Award from the Dallas Press Club and an Eppy Award from Editor & Publisher in 2008 for "Best Web Site".

In 2009, Gap Communications, a company specializing in mid-sized radio markets, acquired Pegasus News.

In July 2012, Pegasus News was acquired by The Dallas Morning News. The website was closed in February 2014.

References

External links 
 Official site
 Article about Pegasus News on Poynter Online

American news websites